Tom or Thomas McGuinness may refer to:

Tom McGuinness (Gaelic footballer), Irish Gaelic footballer
Tom McGuinness (musician) (born 1941), guitarist and songwriter
Tom McGuinness (artist) (1926–2006), British coal miner and artist
 Thomas McGuinness, first officer on American Airlines Flight 11

See also
Tom McGinnis (born 1947), American professional golfer